The 1915 Heywood by-election was held in England on 10 November 1915.  The by-election was held due to the incumbent Liberal MP, Harold Thomas Cawley, being killed in the Battle of Gallipoli.  It was won by the Liberal candidate Albert Illingworth who was unopposed due to a War-time electoral pact.

References

Heywood 1915
Heywood
1910s in Lancashire
Heywood 1915
Heywood 1915
Heywood 1915
Unopposed by-elections to the Parliament of the United Kingdom (need citation)